Davide Mazzocco (born 6 October 1995) is an Italian footballer who plays as a midfielder for  club Avellino.

Club career
Mazzocco joined Parma U-19 team in the summer of 2012 and played for it for the next two seasons. He was never called up to the senior team. Before the 2014–15 season, he joined Padova, which was playing in Serie D at the time.

He made his Serie C debut for Padova on 13 September 2015 in a game against Pro Piacenza as a 65th-minute substitute for Marco Cunico. On 22 December 2017, he extended his Padova contract to June 2019. Padova was promoted to Serie B for the 2018–19 season, with Mazzocco making his debut at that level.

On 4 July 2019, Mazzocco signed to Serie A side SPAL for free. On the same day, he joined Pordenone on loan until 30 June 2020.

On 4 October 2020 he was loaned to Serie B club Virtus Entella.

On 31 August 2021, he joined Cittadella.

On 19 January 2023, Mazzocco signed with Avellino in Serie C.

References

External links
 

Living people
1995 births
People from Feltre
Sportspeople from the Province of Belluno
Footballers from Veneto
Association football midfielders
Italian footballers
Calcio Padova players
S.P.A.L. players
Pordenone Calcio players
Virtus Entella players
A.S. Cittadella players
U.S. Avellino 1912 players
Serie B players
Serie C players
Serie D players